Lewis Grassic Gibbon was the pseudonym of James Leslie Mitchell (13 February 1901 – 7 February 1935), a Scottish writer. He was best known for A Scots Quair, a trilogy set in the north-east of Scotland in the early 20th century, of which all three parts have been serialised on BBC television.

Biography
Born in Auchterless and raised from the age of seven in Arbuthnott, in the former county of Kincardineshire, Mitchell started working as a journalist for the Aberdeen Journal in 1917 and later for the Farmers Weekly after moving to Glasgow. Gibbon grew up in Stonehaven, and attended Mackie Academy. During that time he was active with the British Socialist Party.

In 1919, Mitchell joined the Royal Army Service Corps and served in Iran, India and Egypt before enlisting in the Royal Air Force in 1920. In the RAF he worked as a clerk and spent some time in the Middle East.

When he married Rebecca Middleton (known as Ray) in 1925, they settled in Welwyn Garden City. He began writing full time in 1929, producing numerous books and shorter works under his real name and his pseudonym. He suffered an early death in 1935 from peritonitis, brought on by a perforated ulcer.

Fiction
Mitchell gained attention from his earliest attempts at fiction, notably from H. G. Wells, but it was his trilogy entitled A Scots Quair, and in particular its first book Sunset Song, with which he made his mark. A Scots Quair, with its combination of stream-of-consciousness, lyrical use of dialect, and social realism, is considered to be among the defining works of the 20th century Scottish Renaissance. It tells the story of Chris Guthrie, a young woman growing up in the north-east of Scotland in the early 20th century. All three parts of the trilogy have been turned into serials by BBC Scotland, written by Bill Craig, with Vivien Heilbron as Chris. Additionally, Sunset Song has been adapted into a film, released in 2015. Spartacus, a novel set in the famous slave revolt, is his best-known full-length work outside this trilogy.

In 1934 Mitchell collaborated with Hugh MacDiarmid on Scottish Scene, which included three of Gibbon's short stories. His stories were collected posthumously in A Scots Hairst (1969). Possibly his best-known is "Smeddum", a Scots word which could be best translated as the colloquial term "guts". Like A Scots Quair, it is set in north-east Scotland with strong female characters. It was dramatised by Bill Craig and the BBC, as a Play for Today in 1976, along with two other short stories, "Clay" and "Greenden". Also notable is his essay The Land.

Remembrance
The Grassic Gibbon Centre was established in Arbuthnott in 1991 to commemorate the author's life. There is a memorial to him and his wife, and other members of the Mitchell family, in the western corner of the village churchyard (parish church of Saint Ternan) of Arbuthnott, nowadays in Aberdeenshire.

In 2016 Sunset Song was voted Scotland's favourite novel in the BBC Love to Read campaign. A feature article on the novel has been written by Nicola Sturgeon, who edited a recent edition.

Bibliography
Hanno: or the Future of Exploration (1928) 
Stained Radiance: A Fictionist's Prelude (1930) 
The Thirteenth Disciple (1931) 
The Calends of Cairo (1931) 
Three Go Back (1932)  
The Lost Trumpet (1932) 
Sunset Song (1932), the first book of the trilogy A Scots Quair 
Persian Dawns, Egyptian Nights (1932) 
Image and Superscription (1933) 
Cloud Howe (1933), the second book of the trilogy A Scots Quair 
Spartacus (1933) 
Niger: The Life of Mungo Park (1934) 
The Conquest of the Maya (1934) 
Gay Hunter (1934) 
Scottish Scene (1934), with Hugh MacDiarmid
Grey Granite (1934), the third book of the trilogy A Scots Quair 
Nine Against the Unknown (1934) 
The Speak of the Mearns (1982), published posthumously

Reviews
Glenda Norquay, "Echoes from The Mearns", reviewing The Speak of the Mearns, in Sheila G. Hearn, ed., Cencrastus No. 13, Summer 1983, pp. 54–55

References

Further reading
Ian Campbell, Lewis Grassic Gibbon (Edinburgh: Scottish Academic Press, 1985)
Cairns Craig, Fearful Selves: Character, Community and the Scottish Imagination, in Cencrastus No. 4, Winter 1980–1881, pp. 29–32, 
Douglas Gifford, In Search of the Scottish Renaissance: The Reprinting of Scottish Fiction, in Cencrastus No. 9, Summer 1982, pp. 26 – 30, 
Douglas Gifford, Neil M. Gunn & Lewis Grassic Gibbon (Edinburgh: Oliver & Boyd, 1983)
Scott Lyall, ed., The International Companion to Lewis Grassic Gibbon (Glasgow: Scottish Literature International, ASLS, 2015) 
Scott Lyall, "J. Leslie Mitchell/Lewis Grassic Gibbon and Exploration", in Scottish Literary Review 4.1, Spring/Summer 2012, pp. 131–150
Scott Lyall, '"East is West and West is East": Lewis Grassic Gibbon's Quest for Ultimate Cosmopolitanism', in Gardiner et al. (eds), Scottish Literature and Postcolonial Literature (Edinburgh: Edinburgh University Press, 2011), pp. 136–146
Scott Lyall, 'On Cosmopolitanism and Late Style: Lewis Grassic Gibbon and James Joyce', in Dymock and Palmer McCulloch (eds), Scottish and International Modernisms (Glasgow: ASLS, 2011), pp. 101–115
Margery Palmer McCulloch and Sarah Dunnigan (eds), A Flame in the Mearns (Glasgow: ASLS, 2003)
William K. Malcolm, A Blasphemer and Reformer: A Study of J. Leslie Mitchell/Lewis Grassic Gibbon (Aberdeen: Aberdeen University Press, 1984)
Iain S. Munro, Leslie Mitchell: Lewis Grassic Gibbon, (Oliver and Boyd, 1966)
Douglas F. Young, Beyond the Sunset: A Study of James Leslie Mitchell (Lewis Grassic Gibbon) (Aberdeen: Impulse Publications, 1973)

External links
The Lewis Grassic Gibbon Website

The Grassic Gibbon Centre
Writing Scotland on Gibbon

1901 births
1935 deaths
20th-century British novelists
British Communist writers
Deaths from peritonitis
People from Aberdeenshire
People from Kincardine and Mearns
People from Welwyn Garden City
Scottish historical novelists
20th-century Scottish novelists
Scottish Renaissance
Scottish socialists
Writers of historical fiction set in antiquity
20th-century pseudonymous writers
20th-century British Army personnel
Royal Army Service Corps soldiers
20th-century Royal Air Force personnel
Royal Air Force airmen